Matthew Wyatt Joseph Fry (1863 – 2 December 1943) was an Irish mathematician and academic who served as Professor of Natural Philosophy at Trinity College Dublin (TCD) from 1910 to 1925.

Life and career
Fry was born in County Clare, where his father was Rev Henry Fry of Kilkeedy parish (diocese of Killaloe), the family later moving to Bourney parish, Corbally, Roscrea, Co Tipperary. Matthew attended Galway Grammar school, and then TCD, studying mathematics.  He was awarded BA (1885), and MA and Fellowship (1889), being appointed Assistant to the Professor of Natural Philosophy that same year.  In 1910 he became the Erasmus Smith's Professor of Natural and Experimental Philosophy. He was also Junior Dean (1893-1897), representative of the Junior Fellows on the Board (1911-1917) and became Senior Proctor in 1918.  He retired in 1925 and died in Dublin in 1943.

References

19th-century Irish mathematicians
Alumni of Trinity College Dublin
Academics of Trinity College Dublin
1863 births
1943 deaths
Date of birth missing
20th-century Irish mathematicians
People from County Clare